Daniel Stein may refer to:

 Daniel Stein (mime) (born 1952), American modern mime performer
 Daniel Stein (water polo) (born 1983), water polo player from Canada
 Daniel L. Stein (born 1953), American professor of physics and mathematics
 Dan Stein (attorney) (born 1955), president of the Federation for American Immigration Reform
 Dan J. Stein, professor of psychiatry
 DJ Fresh (Daniel Stein, born 1977), drum and bass artist
 Daniel Stein (rabbi) (born 1976), Rosh Yeshiva Yeshiva University and Rav of the Ridniker Shteibel

See also
 Daniel Stern (disambiguation)